Fosteria may refer to:
 The former name of Paloma, California
 Fosteria (brachiopod), a brachiopod genus
 Fosteria (plant), a synonym for Tigridia, a plant genus in the family Iridaceae